Fromelles Military Cemetery can mean:
 V.C. Corner Australian Cemetery and Memorial, 2 kilometres northwest of the village of Fromelles
 Fromelles (Pheasant Wood) Military Cemetery, on the outskirts of the village itself